Guo Shuxian may refer to:

Guo Zhongshu (died 977), painter and scholar during the Five Dynasties period and Song dynasty
Ann Kok (born 1973), Singaporean actress